The Battle for Last Place is the second studio album by Slave Unit, released on April 3, 2007. It was released eleven years after the band's 1996 self-titled album.

Reception
Fabryka Music Magazine lauded The Battle for Last Place and awarded it a four out of four, saying "Slave Unit may be considered as the best example and a turning point for bands which used to perform guitar driven music."

Track listing

Personnel
Adapted from The Battle for Last Place liner notes.

Slave Unit
 Mike Welch – lead vocals, guitar, bass guitar, sampler, programming, drums, percussion, production, engineering

Production and design
 Shawn Brice – cover art, illustrations
 Andrew Lindsay – illustrations

Release history

References

External links 
 The Battle for Last Place at Bandcamp
 The Battle for Last Place at Discogs (list of releases)

2007 albums
Slave Unit albums